Ruben Enrique Douglas (born October 30, 1979) is a Panamanian-American professional basketball player. He is a 1.96 m (6 ft 5 in) 210 lb (95 kg) point guard-shooting guard.

High school
Douglas played high school basketball at Bellarmine-Jefferson High School in Burbank, California. He is ranked as one of the most prolific high school scorers in California state history.

College career
After high school, Douglas played college basketball at the University of Arizona with the Arizona Wildcats in the 1998–99 season. Douglas led the NCAA in scoring with a 28.0 points per game average during the 2002–03 season as a senior year at the University of New Mexico while playing with the New Mexico Lobos. He was also named the Mountain West Conference MVP.

Professional career
After going undrafted by any NBA teams, Douglas took his game overseas. He has played for Panionios of the Greek league (2003–04), Virtus Roma and Fortitudo Bologna (2004–05) of the Italian league, the latter with whom he won the Italian national championship, as well as Dynamo Moscow of the Russian league (2005–06), and Valencia of the Spanish league (2006–09). In 2010, he returned to Panionios.

Douglas won the EuroCup championship in 2006 with Dynamo Moscow, and he was also named the EuroCup Finals MVP. Douglas last played with Uşak Üniversitesi Belediyespor, a Turkish team playing in the Turkish Second Division, starting in January 2012. He played against Tenis Eskrim Dağcılık in his first game with Uşak Belediyespor, on January 8, 2012.

Panama national team
Douglas was also a member of the senior men's Panama national basketball team that competed at the 2006 FIBA World Championship.

Career statistics

Domestic leagues

References

External links
Euroleague.net Profile
Draftexpress.com Profile
Eurobasket.com Profile

1979 births
Living people
2006 FIBA World Championship players
African-American basketball players
American expatriate basketball people in Greece
American expatriate basketball people in Italy
American expatriate basketball people in Russia
American expatriate basketball people in Spain
American expatriate basketball people in Turkey
American men's basketball players
American sportspeople of Panamanian descent
Arizona Wildcats men's basketball players
Basketball players from Pasadena, California
BC Dynamo Moscow players
Fortitudo Pallacanestro Bologna players
Liga ACB players
New Mexico Lobos men's basketball players
Pallacanestro Virtus Roma players
Panamanian men's basketball players
Panionios B.C. players
People with acquired Panamanian citizenship
Point guards
Real Betis Baloncesto players
Shooting guards
Uşak Sportif players
Valencia Basket players
21st-century African-American sportspeople
20th-century African-American sportspeople